Bull Hollow is an unincorporated community and census-designated place (CDP) in Delaware County, Oklahoma, United States. The population was 67 at the 2010 census.

Geography
Bull Hollow is located in southwestern Delaware County at  (36.304321, -94.881969), along Saline Creek and its tributary valleys. It is bordered to the north by the Tagg Flats CDP and to the west by the Kenwood CDP.

Demographics

As of the census of 2000, there were 84 people, 31 households, and 20 families residing in the CDP. The population density was 15.7 people per square mile (6.1/km2). There were 33 housing units at an average density of 6.2/sq mi (2.4/km2). The racial makeup of the community was 16.67% White, 76.19% Native American, and 7.14% from two or more races.

There were 31 households, out of which 32.3% had children under the age of 18 living with them, 48.4% were married couples living together, 12.9% had a female householder with no husband present, and 32.3% were non-families. 29.0% of all households were made up of individuals, and 22.6% had someone living alone who was 65 years of age or older. The average household size was 2.71 and the average family size was 3.43.

In the CDP, the population was spread out, with 25.0% under the age of 18, 10.7% from 18 to 24, 31.0% from 25 to 44, 20.2% from 45 to 64, and 13.1% who were 65 years of age or older. The median age was 38 years. For every 100 females, there were 100.0 males. For every 100 females age 18 and over, there were 103.2 males.

The median income for a household in the CDP was $11,875, and the median income for a family was $13,194. Males had a median income of $51,250 versus $13,750 for females. The per capita income for the community was $6,736. There were 60.0% of families and 58.4% of the population living below the poverty line, including 100.0% of under eighteens and none of those over 64.

References

Census-designated places in Delaware County, Oklahoma
Census-designated places in Oklahoma
Cherokee towns in Oklahoma